Antonio Cantisani (2 November 1926 – 1 July 2021) was an Italian Roman Catholic prelate. He served as the Archbishop of the Roman Catholic Archdiocese of Rossano-Cariati from 18 November 1971 to 31 July 1980. He was the appointed the Archbishop of the Archdiocese of Catanzaro from 1980 until his retirement in 2003.

Archbishop Emeritus Cantisani died in Catanzaro on 1 July 2021, at the age of 94. He was buried in the crypt of the Basilica dell'Immacolata in Catanzaro on 2 July 2021.

References

1926 births
2021 deaths
21st-century Italian Roman Catholic archbishops
20th-century Italian Roman Catholic archbishops
People from Lauria
People from the Province of Potenza